Telephantasm is a compilation album by the American rock band Soundgarden. Featuring songs that span 23 years of the band's career, it was released on September 28, 2010, through A&M Records. The album was certified platinum by RIAA after its first day of retail availability based on the one million discs that were included in packages for the video game Guitar Hero: Warriors of Rock.

Overview
The album was released in September 2010 on A&M Records following the band's reunion earlier that year. The career-spanning retrospective album includes an unreleased track, "Black Rain", taken from the Badmotorfinger recording sessions. In late August 2010, "Black Rain" reached No. 44 on the Canadian Hot 100 and No. 96 on the U.S. Billboard Hot 100.  "Black Rain" peaked at No. 14 on the Billboard Rock Songs chart.

Kim Thayil explained the title Telephantasm as "an illusion at a distance, or a ghost from afar. Which I think would be an appropriate reference to what we have here — a retrospective of a band that had been inactive for thirteen years." He added that the album emerged from a project to do a "B-Sides" compilation following the 1997 greatest hits album A-Sides, but the band decided to include some more known songs because "we need to re-establish ourselves with the rock and roll audience out there, the younger audience".

The 1-CD version of the album is featured in the music video game Guitar Hero: Warriors of Rock, with "Black Rain" available on the disc, and the remaining eleven tracks available as downloadable content alongside release of the game.

The 2-CD/DVD limited edition package includes a booklet containing a biography of Soundgarden written by Jeff Gilbert, a message from Kim Thayil and content credits.

The 3-LP 12" Vinyl Edition includes all songs along with a one time use download key for all the songs in 320 kbit/s mp3 format taken directly from the vinyl.

The album features artwork by Josh Graham, who handles the visual arts for Neurosis, as well as artwork for other artists.

Track listing
All songs written and composed by Chris Cornell, except where noted.

Single-disc version

Deluxe edition
Disc one

Disc two

DVD

Bonus videos

Personnel 
Soundgarden
Chris Cornell – lead vocals, rhythm guitar
Kim Thayil – lead guitar
Ben Shepherd – bass on tracks 3–12 (Single Disc), tracks 9–12 on CD1, and tracks 1–12 on CD2 (Deluxe Edition)
Matt Cameron – drums
Hiro Yamamoto – bass on tracks 1–2 (Single Disc) and tracks 1–7 on CD1 (Deluxe Edition)
Jason Everman – bass on track 8 on CD1 (Deluxe Edition)
Scott Sundquist – drums on track 1 on CD1 (Deluxe Edition)

Charts

Certifications

References

2010 greatest hits albums
Soundgarden compilation albums
A&M Records compilation albums
Interscope Records compilation albums
Albums produced by Chris Cornell
Albums produced by Matt Cameron
Albums produced by Jack Endino
Albums produced by Terry Date
Albums produced by Adam Kasper